Gerd Wimmer  (born January 9, 1977) is an Austrian former professional footballer who played as a midfielder.

Club career
Wimmer was born in Laa an der Thaya, Lower Austria. His first club was his hometown club SV Laa an der Thaya. His first professional club was Admira Wacker, moving to Sturm Graz in 1995 and rejoining Admira later that year at the start of the 1995–1996 season. In 1997, he joined Vienna club Rapid Wien for whom he played three seasons, before moving abroad to play for German sides Eintracht Frankfurt, Hansa Rostock and Rot-Weiß Oberhausen.

In 2005, he returned to Austria to play for VfB Admira Wacker Mödling and a year later he signed for Austria Wien. On April 18, 2006 he received a record ban of 12 matches after attacking Wacker Tirol assistant manager Klaus Vogler after a match.

International career
Wimmer made his debut for the Austria national team in an August 1999 friendly match against Sweden in Malmö and earned five caps, no goals scored. His final international was a September 2002 European Championship qualification match against Moldova.

Career statistics

International

References

External links
 Rapid stats - Rapid Archive
 Profile - Austria Archive
 Gerd Wimmer - Eintracht-archiv
 
 German Bundesliga stats - Fussballportal

Living people
1977 births
People from Mistelbach District
Association football midfielders
Austrian footballers
Austria international footballers
FC Admira Wacker Mödling players
SK Sturm Graz players
SK Rapid Wien players
Eintracht Frankfurt players
FC Hansa Rostock players
Rot-Weiß Oberhausen players
FK Austria Wien players
Austrian Football Bundesliga players
Bundesliga players
Expatriate footballers in Germany
Footballers from Lower Austria